Thlibops is a genus of beetles in the family Carabidae, containing the following species:

 Thlibops congoensis Basilewsky, 1958
 Thlibops longicollis (Putzeys, 1846)

References

Scaritinae